Sumowood Harris is a Liberian Lutheran bishop. He served as the president of the Liberian Council of Churches and is a peace activist.

See also
 Benjamin Dorme Lartey

References

Year of birth missing (living people)
Living people
Liberian Lutheran clergy
Liberian anti-war activists
Lutheran pacifists
21st-century Lutheran clergy